The 1916 West Tennessee State Normal football team was an American football team that represented West Tennessee State Normal School (now known as the University of Memphis) as an independent during the 1916 college football season. In their first season under head coach Tom Shea, West Tennessee State Normal compiled a 2–3–1 record.

Schedule

References

West Tennessee State Normal
Memphis Tigers football seasons
West Tennessee State Normal football